Pierre Coetzer (born 6 December 1961) is a former heavyweight boxer from Pretoria, South Africa. Coetzer's most notable fights include those against Johnny du Plooy, Riddick Bowe, Frank Bruno and George Foreman.

Professional career
Coetzer began his professional boxing career in 1983. After winning his first nine fights, he was matched up against American cruiserweight Bernard Benton. In their July 1984 ten-round bout in Durban, Benton won on points. In September 1984, he fought Benny Knoetze for the vacant South African Heavyweight Title, and knocked him out in the third round, after being dropped twice in round two.

Over the next three years, Coetzer notched a dozen victories; including wins against Larry Frazier, Eddie "Young Joe Louis" Taylor, and Alfredo Evangelista. He also won his rematch bout with Bernard Benton on 28 September 1987, when he knocked him out in the first round. He then faced Puerto Rican Ossie Ocasio, who had won the WBA Cruiserweight Championship, and who had defeated boxers such as Jimmy Young, Dwight Muhammad Qawi, and Robbie Williams. On 6 March 1988, they had their first match at the Good Hope Centre in Cape Town. Ocasio won the ten-round bout on points, which gave Coetzer his first loss since the South African Heavyweight Title. However, after defeating Tim Anderson (U.S.) and Manoel De Almeida (Brazil), Coetzer faced Ocasio in a rematch at the Standard Bank Indoor Arena, and won the ten-round bout on points.

After six more wins, Coetzer faced local heavyweight Johnny du Plooy, who had won 196 of his 200 amateur fights, and who had scored 17 knockouts in his first 20 professional fights. They met on 4 August 1990 at the Sun City Superbowl, in a bout billed "Once and For All". Du Plooy cut Coetzer with his first right punch, and had him down towards the end of the first round, but Coetzer dropped Du Plooy twice in the second round and won the fight by TKO.

Coetzer went on to earn a number-one contender spot for Evander Holyfield's IBF world title, but was made to fight a WBA Heavyweight Title Eliminator, scheduled for 12 rounds, against the number-two contender, Riddick Bowe. The bout took place on 18 July 1992 in Las Vegas, Nevada. During the fight, Bowe was ahead in scoring, although Coetzer disagreed. In the sixth round, Bowe hit Coetzer below the belt, for which the referee Mills Lane had deducted a point. In the seventh round, Bowe hit Coetzer with what appeared to be a right-handed low blow. Coetzer turned away, and anticipated that Lane would warn Bowe, however, he left his hands down, and Bowe delivered a jolting right uppercut. Bowe then followed with a left and right that drove Coetzer into the ropes, which caused Lane to step in and end the match with a TKO. "It definitely shouldn't have been stopped," said Coetzer. "It was a low blow."

Coetzer fought Frank Bruno from London, England. The referee stopped the fight in the eighth round and Bruno was awarded a TKO. His final career bout was against George Foreman; he was knocked down briefly in the fourth round, but eventually lost by TKO when he was knocked down again in the eighth.

Professional boxing record

|-
| style="text-align:center;" colspan="8"|39 Wins (27 knockouts, 12 decisions), 5 Losses (3 knockouts, 2 decisions)
|-  style="text-align:center; background:#e3e3e3;"
|  style="border-style:none none solid solid; "|Result
|  style="border-style:none none solid solid; "|Record
|  style="border-style:none none solid solid; "|Opponent
|  style="border-style:none none solid solid; "|Type
|  style="border-style:none none solid solid; "|Round
|  style="width:80px; border-style:none none solid solid; "|Date
|  style="border-style:none none solid solid; "|Location
|  style="border-style:none none solid solid; "|Notes
|-
|Loss
|39–5
|align=left| George Foreman
|TKO
|8
|1993-01-16
|align=left| 
|align=left|
|-
|Loss
|39–4
|align=left| Frank Bruno
|TKO
|8
|1992-10-17
|align=left| 
|align=left|
|-
|Loss
|39–3
|align=left| Riddick Bowe
|TKO
|7
|1992-07-18
|align=left| 
|align=left|
|-
|Win
|39–2
|align=left| Carlton West
|TKO
|1
|1992-05-16
|align=left| 
|align=left|
|-
|Win
|38–2
|align=left| Dan Murphy
|TKO
|3
|1991-10-19
|align=left| 
|align=left|
|-
|Win
|37–2
|align=left| Jerry Halstead
|PTS
|10
|1991-07-27
|align=left| 
|align=left|
|-
|Win
|36–2
|align=left| José Ribalta
|PTS
|10
|1991-05-11
|align=left| 
|align=left|
|-
|Win
|35–2
|align=left| Ken Lakusta
|TKO
|2
|1990-12-16
|align=left| 
|align=left|
|-
|Win
|34–2
|align=left| Kimmuel Odum
|TKO
|10
|1990-12-15
|align=left| 
|align=left|
|-
|Win
|33–2
|align=left| J.B. Williamson
|PTS
|10
|1990-11-08
|align=left| 
|align=left|
|-
|Win
|32–2
|align=left| Johnny du Plooy
|TKO
|2
|1990-08-04
|align=left| 
|align=left|
|-
|Win
|31–2
|align=left| Philipp Brown
|TKO
|9
|1990-06-09
|align=left| 
|align=left|
|-
|Win
|30–2
|align=left| Everett Martin
|UD
|10
|1990-05-05
|align=left| 
|align=left|
|-
|Win
|29–2
|align=left| Bobby Hitz
|KO
|1
|1989-09-09
|align=left| 
|align=left|
|-
|Win
|28–2
|align=left| Michael Greer
|KO
|6
|1989-05-29
|align=left|  
|align=left|
|-
|Win
|27–2
|align=left| James Pritchard
|TKO
|8
|1989-03-18
|align=left| 
|align=left|
|-
|Win
|26–2
|align=left| Mike White
|TKO
|8
|1989-02-11
|align=left| 
|align=left|
|-
|Win
|25–2
|align=left| Ossie Ocasio
|PTS
|10
|1988-11-26
|align=left| 
|align=left|
|-
|Win
|24–2
|align=left| Manoel De Almeida
|TKO
|4
|1988-09-28
|align=left| 
|align=left|
|-
|Win
|23–2
|align=left| Tim Anderson
|KO
|2
|1988-08-15
|align=left| 
|align=left|
|-
|Loss
|22–2
|align=left| Ossie Ocasio
|PTS
|10
|1988-03-06
|align=left| 
|align=left|
|-
|Win
|22–1
|align=left| Bernard Benton
|KO
|1
|1987-09-28
|align=left| 
|align=left|
|-
|Win
|21–1
|align=left| Alfredo Evangelista
|PTS
|10
|1987-08-30
|align=left| 
|align=left|
|-
|Win
|20–1
|align=left| Chris Jacobs
|KO
|2
|1987-03-08
|align=left| 
|align=left|
|-
|Win
|19–1
|align=left| Luis Lozano
|KO
|1
|1986-09-27
|align=left| 
|align=left|
|-
|Win
|18–1
|align=left| Kevin P Porter
|TKO
|6
|1986-05-14
|align=left| 
|align=left|
|-
|Win
|17–1
|align=left| Tommy Franco Thomas
|TKO
|2
|1986-04-02
|align=left| 
|align=left|
|-
|Win
|16–1
|align=left| Eddie Taylor
|TKO
|9
|1986-02-19
|align=left| 
|align=left|
|-
|Win
|15–1
|align=left| Larry Frazier
|PTS
|10
|1985-09-30
|align=left| 
|align=left|
|-
|Win
|14–1
|align=left| Dion Simpson
|TKO
|8
|1985-09-07
|align=left| 
|align=left|
|-
|Win
|13–1
|align=left| David Jaco
|KO
|6
|1985-07-08
|align=left| 
|align=left|
|-
|Win
|12–1
|align=left| Rocky Sekorski
|PTS
|10
|1985-05-13
|align=left| 
|align=left|
|-
|Win
|11–1
|align=left| Mark Lee
|PTS
|10
|1985-03-25
|align=left| 
|align=left|
|-
|Win
|10–1
|align=left| Bennie Knoetze
|KO
|3
|1984-09-22
|align=left| 
|align=left|
|-
|Loss
|9–1
|align=left| Bernard Benton
|PTS
|10
|1984-07-16
|align=left|  
|align=left|
|-
|Win
|9–0
|align=left| Leroy Caldwell
|PTS
|8
|1984-05-21
|align=left| 
|align=left|
|-
|Win
|8–0
|align=left| Felipe Rodriguez
|TKO
|2
|1984-03-31
|align=left| 
|align=left|
|-
|Win
|7–0
|align=left| Billy Joe Thomas
|TKO
|5
|1984-01-28
|align=left| 
|align=left|
|-
|Win
|6–0
|align=left| Steve Gee
|PTS
|8
|1983-09-03
|align=left| 
|align=left|
|-
|Win
|5–0
|align=left| Ron Ellis
|KO
|4
|1983-07-04
|align=left| 
|align=left|
|-
|Win
|4–0
|align=left| Louis Hendricks
|TKO
|5
|1983-06-11
|align=left| 
|align=left|
|-
|Win
|3–0
|align=left| Jerry Shezi
|PTS
|6
|1983-04-23
|align=left| 
|align=left|
|-
|Win
|2–0
|align=left| Caiphus Masondo
|KO
|2
|1983-03-14
|align=left| 
|align=left|
|-
|Win
|1–0
|align=left| Isaac Ndlamlenze
|TKO
|1
|1983-02-05
|align=left| 
|align=left|
|}

References

External links
 
 Pierre Coetzer at sportspotter.com

1961 births
Living people
Sportspeople from Pretoria
Heavyweight boxers
South African male boxers